Telesat, formerly Telesat Canada, is a Canadian satellite communications company founded on May 2, 1969. The company is headquartered in Ottawa.

History 
Telesat began as Telesat Canada, a Canadian Crown corporation created by an Act of Parliament, in 1969. Telesat Canada launched Anik A1 in 1972 as the world's first domestic communications satellite in geostationary orbit operated by a commercial company; this satellite was retired from use in 1981. Until February 1979, Telesat had a legal monopoly on Earth stations in Canada: any entity wishing to send or receive satellite signals had to sign a long-term lease with Telesat Canada for an Earth station. Contracts for such leases were still enforced after the monopoly was ended.

Telesat Canada was privatized and sold by the federal government to Bell Canada in 1998.

On December 18, 2006, Loral Space & Communications announced that it, along with Canada's Public Sector Pension Investment Board (PSP Investments), would acquire Telesat for US$2.8 billion.

On October 5, 2007, Loral Space & Communications Inc. and the Public Sector Pension Investment Board of Canada received the final regulatory approval necessary to complete the acquisition of Telesat from BCE Inc. for CAD$3.25 billion. The acquisition closed on October 31, 2007, with Loral owning 63% of Telesat.

At the same time, Telesat merged with Loral Skynet (formerly AT&T Skynet), a subsidiary of Loral Space & Communications. Loral Skynet was a full-service global satellite operator headquartered in Bedminster, New Jersey. This resulted in the transfer of all of the assets of Loral Skynet to Telesat.

Telesat announced on December 30, 2009, that Nimiq 6 was built by Space Systems/Loral (SS/L). Bell Satellite TV, a Canadian satellite TV provider agreed to fully lease the satellite for its lifetime to serve their subscribers across Canada. Nimiq 6 has a payload of 32 high-powered Ku-band transponders. It uses the SS/L1300 platform and has a 15-year mission life. It was launched in 2012 by International Launch Services (ILS).

On November 17, 2010: Telesat Holdings Inc. hired JPMorgan Chase & Co., Morgan Stanley and Credit Suisse Group AG to start a formal sales process and offer so-called staple financing to interest buyers for $6 billion to $7 billion.

MHI Launch Services (formerly H-IIA Launch Services) ) launched Telstar 12 VANTAGE for Telesat in November 2015 on a H2A204 variant of the H-IIA rocket, and it commenced service in December 2015.

Lightspeed LEO constellation 
The siting of the orbital planes is to comply with the Canadian government's Enhanced Satellite Constellation Project, as well as providing global coverage. The constellation is officially named Telesat Lightspeed.

In 2017, Telesat expanded the LEO constellation plan to about 300 satellites, coupled with 50 ground stations across the globe. There would be about 80 polar orbit satellites, with the remainder in inclined orbits, for global coverage, including polar regions. The internet satellite constellation is targeted to have a 30-50 ms latency. The constellation is expected to have a 16-24 Tb/s capacity with 8 Tbit/s (1 TB/s) available for customers.

In 2018, the Phase 1 pathfinder test satellite for the LEO constellation was launched. Various customers and satellite transceiver equipment manufacturers started testing with the satellite.

In 2019, Telesat contracted with Blue Origin on their New Glenn rocket and Relativity Space with their Terran 1 rocket, for satellite launches to their LEO constellation.

In 2020, Telesat filed plans for expanding the satellite count to its LEO constellation to over 1600 satellites. In November 2020, Telesat announced that it will become a publicly traded on the American stock index NASDAQ in mid 2021.

Services 
The company is the fourth-largest fixed satellite services provider in the world. It owns a fleet of satellites, with others under construction, and operates additional satellites for other entities.

Telesat carries Canada's two major DBS providers signals: Bell Satellite TV and Shaw Direct, as well as more than 200 of Canada's television channels.

Telesat's Anik F2 carries a Ka-band spot beam payload for satellite Internet access for Wildblue users in the United States and Xplornet users in Canada. The KA band system uses spot beams to manage bandwidth concerns, linking to multiple satellite ground stations connected to the Internet.

Offices

Satellites launched for Telesat 

 Anik A1 – 1972
 Anik A2 – 1973
 Anik A3 – 1975
 Anik B – 1978
 Anik D1 – 1982 – decommissioned 1991
 Anik C3 – 1982
 Anik C2 – 1983 – sold to Paracom S.A. 1993
 Anik D2 – 1984 – sold to GE Americom 1991 and ARABSAT 1993
 Anik C1 – 1985 – sold to Paracom S.A. 1993 and decommissioned 2003
 Anik E2 – 1991
 Anik E1 – 1991
 MSAT-1 – 1996
 Nimiq-1 – 1999
 Anik F1 – 2000
 Nimiq-2 – 2002
 Estrela do Sul 1 (Telstar 14) – 2004
 Anik F2 – 2004
 Anik F1R – 2005
 Anik F3 – 2007
 Telstar 11N – entered service on 31 March 2009 
 Nimiq-4 – 2008
 Nimiq-5 – 2009
 Telstar 14R (Estrela do Sul 2) – 2011 – North solar array did not fully deploy.
 Nimiq-6 – 2012
 Telstar 12V – 2015
 Telesat LEO 1 – 2018
 Telstar 19V – 2018
 Telstar 18V – 2018

References

External links 

 Telesat corporate website

 
Cable and DBS companies of Canada
Companies based in Ottawa
Direct broadcast satellite services
Communications satellite operators
Telecommunications companies established in 1969
Mass media companies established in 1969
1969 establishments in Canada
2007 mergers and acquisitions
Space program of Canada